Łuków   is a city in eastern Poland with 30,727 inhabitants (as of January 1, 2005). Since 1999, it has been situated in the Lublin Voivodeship, previously it had belonged to the Siedlce Voivodeship (between 1975–1998). It is the capital of Łuków County.

The town has an area of 35.75 km2, of which forests make up 13%. Łuków is located on the Southern Krzna river, at approximately 160 meters above sea level. For 500 years Łuków, together with neighboring towns Siedlce and Radzyń Podlaski, was part of Lesser Poland, and was located in the extreme northeastern corner of the province. Some time in the 19th century, it became associated with another historical region of Poland, Podlasie.

Etymology
The name of the town first appeared in documents in 1233 (Castelani nostri de Lucow). Łuków comes from Old Slavic word łuk, which means "a place located in a wetland".

History 
Łuków was established as a grod, around the year 1233. It guarded eastern border of the Sandomierz Land, against warring tribes from the East including the Yotvingians and the Lithuanians. In the first half of the 13th century, Łuków was the seat of Lesser Poland's castellany, positioned in a strategic corner of the province. After  prince of Kraków and Sandomierz Bolesław V the Chaste brought here the Knights Templar (1250–1257), a Roman Catholic Diocese of Łuków was established here. It existed for a very short time (1254–1257), and was closed after protests of the Teutonic Knights. In the late Middle Ages, Łuków was frequently invaded and destroyed by the Old Prussians, Yotvingians, Lithuanians, and Tatars. The city life improved only after 1385 (see Union of Krewo), when Poland and Lithuania became allies. In 1403, Łuków was officially granted a charter, codifying its legal status. The town originally belonged to the Sandomierz Voivodeship, but in 1474, it became part of the Lublin Voivodeship (1474–1795).

Łuków frequently burned (1517, 1528, 1530). Its period of prosperity in the first half of the 17th century came to an end after the Swedish Deluge (1655–1660), when it was ransacked and burned by the Swedes. In the second half of the 18th century, Łuków had some 3,000 residents. The town began a slow recovery, but in 1782, in a great fire, it almost completely burned, and as a result, its population decreased by 50%. At that time, Łuków was a prominent centers of education in the region. In 1701, Piarist monks opened a college in Łuków, which later became one of the first in Poland to carry out the reforms of the Commission of National Education.

During the Partitions of Poland, Łuków was annexed by the Austrian Empire (1795), but since 1815, it was part of the Russian-controlled Congress Poland. Its inhabitants took active role in Polish uprisings of the 19th century (November Uprising, January Uprising). Russian discriminatory policies brought an end to education in the town, as the high school was moved to Siedlce. After Poland regained its independence as the Second Polish Republic in 1918, Łuków was again assigned to the Lublin Voivodeship. It was home to a military garrison with several mounted units stationed there. Jews made about 50% of the population. Almost all of them were murdered in the Holocaust.

World War II 

In May 1941 a large Jewish ghetto was formed by German administration. It was fenced-out in mid-September 1942, and liquidated before the end of the same year. The number of inmates was nearly 12,000. Deportations took place on the 5th and 8 October, and the 7th and 8 November. Around 9,000 Jews were put onto Holocaust trains and sent to Treblinka extermination camp where they were murdered. Approximately 2,200 inmates were shot locally into execution pits. On 28 October, more Jews were brought in from Adamów, Wojcieszków, Kock, Tuchowicz, and Trzebieszów, about 4,500 in total. Many were executed locally, while others were sent to Treblinka along with the locals. After the wave of deportations and transfers, the ghetto was rearranged as a slave labor camp for Jewish workers employed in the Gestapo warehouses. In December 1942, approximately 500 of them were shot dead. Five months later, on May 2, 1943, the remaining 3,000–4,000 Jews were transported to Treblinka extermination camp. Only about 150 Jews of Łuków survived the Holocaust, mostly in the USSR. They migrated to Israel, Western Europe, and the United States of America.

Also, Łuków was an important center of anti-German resistance (see Home Army). On 4 September 1939, the German Luftwaffe bombed Łuków's train station causing many civilian deaths as a result.

Post-World War II 
After the war, two large factories were built in town: the "Lukbut" shoe factory and a meat plant owned by Henryk Stokłosa. 

Among the popular points of interest are:
 Bernardine church and monastery (second half of the 18th century)
 Late Baroque Collegiate Church (1733–1762)
 19th century railway station

Transport 

Łuków railway station is an important railroad junction, located on the strategic east-west line from Brest-Litovsk to Warsaw and Berlin. Other lines stemming from Łuków are the connections to Dęblin and to Skierniewice.

Education 

 Wyższa Szkoła Biznesu i Administracji
 Medyczne Studium Zawodowe
 I Liceum Ogólnokształcące im. Tadeusza Kościuszki (Tadeusz Kościuszko High School)
 IV Liceum Ogólnokształcące im. Jana Pawła II (John Paul II High School)
 Zespół Szkół Nr 1 im. Henryka Sienkiewicza
 Zespół Szkół Nr 2 im. Aleksandra Świętochowskiego
 Zespół Szkół Nr 3 im. Władysława Stanisława Reymonta
 Language Inspiration - Angielski z Anglikami

See also 
 History of the Jews in Łuków
 Konstantin Petrzhak, a Soviet physicist who was born in Łuków
 Meir Dagan, an Israeli Mossad leader, who lived in Łuków until he was 5 years old

Notes and references

External links 

 Official website

Cities and towns in Lublin Voivodeship
Łuków County
Lesser Poland
Lublin Voivodeship (1474–1795)
Lublin Governorate
Lublin Voivodeship (1919–1939)
Holocaust locations in Poland
Jewish communities destroyed in the Holocaust
Shtetls